Allen Bell (born October 11, 1933) is an American former cyclist. He competed at the 1956 Summer Olympics and the 1960 Summer Olympics.

References

External links
 

1933 births
Living people
American male cyclists
Olympic cyclists of the United States
Cyclists at the 1956 Summer Olympics
Cyclists at the 1960 Summer Olympics
People from Ashley, Pennsylvania
Sportspeople from Pennsylvania
American track cyclists